was a Japanese visual kei punk rock band, formed in Kyoto and active from 1985 to 1991. Their album Hachamecha Kyou reached number 10 on the Oricon chart and was named one of the top albums from 1989 to 1998 in a 2004 issue of the music magazine Band Yarouze. They have performed several times since reuniting for a one-off performance in 2015.

History
Kamaitachi was formed in October 1985 by drummer Ken-chan and bassist Mogwai. After several member changes, vocalist Sceana and guitarist Kazzy joined completing the final lineup. They signed with Free-Will in 1989 and released their debut album, Itachigokko, in September. The album sold out by pre-orders alone, so a second press was released the following year under the title, Super Itachigokko. That year the band signed to Toy's Factory and in September released their major debut, Hachamecha Kyou. They released their third album, Jekyll to Hyde -Masturbation-, on June 1, 1991. However, at a June 26 concert they announced they would disband after their last concert on September 6, 1991, for unknown reasons. Later that month a single and a compilation album, both titled "I Love You", were released to fulfill their contract.

After disbanding, Ken-chan started using the stagename "Kenzi" and started the band The Dead Pop Stars and the long-running hardcore punk act Anti Feminism. Sceana and Kazzy formed the industrial rock duo Genkaku Allergy, while Mogwai performs in the punk band Flesh for Flankenstein.

To celebrate the 30th anniversary of his musical activities, Kenzi held a special concert on October 12, 2015 at Shinjuku Blaze. Kenzi, Sceana, and Mogwai performed four songs as Kamaitachi with guest guitarist Sheja. They reunited again to perform on the first day of the Visual Japan Summit on October 14, 2016 at Makuhari Messe. They then performed two more shows, a one-man live at Shinjuku Loft on January 14, 2017 and a show at Kyoto Muse on April 1, before playing a final concert at Akasaka Blitz on August 5.

Members
 Crazy Danger Nancy Ken-chan/Kenzi – drums 1985–1991, 2015, 2016, 2017 (Sister's No Future, Anti Feminism, The Dead Pop Stars)
  – bass 1985–1991, 2015, 2016, 2017 (Alucard, Flesh For Flankenstein)
 Sceana – vocals 1987–1991, 2015, 2016, 2017 (Genkaku Allergy, Octopus Cult, Alien9Ball, The Splatters)

Former members
  – vocals 1985
  – guitar 1985, vocals 1986
 P-Ken – guitar 1986
 Shinobu – vocals 1986
 Andy – guitar 1987 (Decameron)
 Madoka – guitar 1988
 Kazzy – guitar 1989–1991 (ex-Decameron, Genkaku Allergy)

Discography
Demo tapes
 
 
 
 
 

Singles
 , Oricon Singles Chart Peak Position: No. 14
Theme song for  anime.
 "I Love You" (December 21, 1991) No. 84

Albums
 
 
Second pressing of their debut album.
 , Oricon Albums Chart Peak Position: No. 10
 Jekyll to Hyde -Masturbation- (June 21, 1991) No. 15
 I Love You (September 21, 1991, compilation album) No. 24

Compilations
 Emergency Express Metal Warning 2 (1989, "Kill Yourself")

Videos
 
 
 
 No More Heroes (November 21, 1991)
 , Oricon DVDs Chart Peak Position: No. 110

References

External links
 Official website
 Kenzi official blog
 Sceana official website
 Flesh For Flankenstein official MySpace

Toy's Factory artists
Visual kei musical groups
Japanese punk rock groups
Musical groups established in 1985
Musical groups disestablished in 1991
Musical quartets
Musical groups from Kyoto Prefecture
1985 establishments in Japan